Peoria High School is a public secondary school located in Peoria, Arizona, United States, serving grades 9 to 12. It is the oldest high school in the Peoria Unified School District and opened in 1919; its original building Old Main was constructed in 1922, renovated in 2014, and named a Historic Place in 2019. The school enrolls around 1,500 students, 10% of which participate in the school's Advanced Placement program. There are over 40 clubs on campus, as well as a strong athletics program.

History 
Peoria High School was originally located in the back of a general store/post office combination and taught by a single teacher in 1919, but after a railroad was built in the city, a new building opened in 1922, enrolling 50 students. At its opening, the school, built in the Spanish Colonial Revival style, was the largest structure in town and contained period luxuries such as indoor plumbing. In the next few decades, the school was the only Arizonan high school to continue allowing Japanese American students to attend during World War II, while in 1962, it was the first in the area to allow African American students to participate in sports.

The main building, Old Main, closed in 2008 for renovations, which would begin in 2012 and end in 2014, adding modernized classrooms, labs, and spaces, as well as a student lounge. After its reopening, the building also housed the district's non-traditional high school, the Peoria Flex Academy. The district's Medical, Engineering, and Technology (MET) Academy share the space with the Center, though the District acquired the Arizona Challenger Space Center building in 2017 with plans to move the Academy into the Space Center; by 2019, the District's board members voted to repurpose the center into an Arts Center where students from any high school may take specialized art classes.

In 2019, Old Main was named to the National Register of Historic Places.

Enrollment 
The school currently enrolls around 1,500 students, consisting of 51% male and 49% female students. The majority of students are Hispanic, with 55%, while 30% are White, 8% are Black, 3% are multiracial, 2% are Asian, 1% are Native American, and 0.3% are Native Hawaiian or Pacific Islander. 70% of the students are minorities. 56% of the students are economically disadvantaged, a metric calculated from the number of students receiving free or reduced priced lunches.

Academics 
Peoria High School offers various academic tracks: basic, honors, and Advanced Placement (AP). The basic track allows a wide variety of classes with no added weight in GPA. The honors program offers a somewhat harder work load, countered by a weighting the grade point average differently. The Advanced Placement (AP) program offers college credit with the same grade weighting as an honors class. All students may take a mixture of basic, honors and AP if they wish.

10% of students participate in the AP program.

Peoria High School's graduation rate is around 94%.  The graduation ceremony takes place at the State Farm Stadium, which is located in the neighboring city of Glendale.

Extracurricular activities

Clubs and organizations 
Peoria has a variety of clubs and a marching band that has consistently placed third in its division at the State Marching Band Festival.
 AFJROTC
 AP Euro Club
 ASL Club/ASL Honor Club
 Auto (Automotive club)
 AVID
 Band
 Be a Leader (college-bound seniors)
 Book Club
 Boys State (Junior boys summer government experience)
 Chess Club
 Choir
 Christian Club on Campus

 Clay Club
 Cub Links (freshman mentorship club)
 Culinary Arts
 Dance
 DECA
 Economics Club
 Future Business Leaders of America
 Fellowship of Christian Athletes
 Future Farmers of America
 Freshman Class (Student Council)
 Fuel to Play 60 (Health movement and food club)

 Girls State (Junior girls summer government experience)
 Gay Straight Alliance
 HOPE (Fellowship)
 Jobs for Arizona Graduates (JAG)
 Panthers Knit! (Knitting and crocheting)
 Junior Class (Student Council)
 Mat Maids (Wrestling support group)
 Media Productions
 MESA
 National Honors Society
 Otacon Club (Anime, gaming, and Japanese culture)

 Peoria Open Minds (Creative writing, community outreach)
 Senior Class (Student Council)
 Skills USA/Building Trades
 Sophomore Class (Student Council)
 Spiritline (Cheer, school spirit)
 Sports Medicine
 Student Council
 Thespians
 Winter guard
 Yearbook

Athletics 

Peoria won its first state football championship in 1939, when the team was still known as the Horned Toads.

In the late 1980s, Peoria was one of the most dominant and successful athletics programs in Arizona. Between 1984 and 1989, Peoria won 8 State Championships in Men's and Women's Basketball, Women's Softball, Men's Baseball, Football and Wrestling.

Championships
 Football 4A State Champions: 1944, 1986, 1987, 1994 (co-champions).
 Football Class A District Champs: 1973
 Women's Basketball 4A State Champions: 1988, 1989
 Men's Basketball State Champions: 1937, 1984 (4A), 2012 (Div. II)
 Women's Tennis Doubles State Champ: 1975
 Baseball State Champions: 1988, 1989
 Softball State Champions: 1989
 Wrestling State Championships: 1996, 1997, 1998, 1999
 Men's Track and Field Championships: 2009

Alumni
 Eric Guliford, wide receiver—Arizona State University, Minnesota Vikings and New Orleans Saints
 Tim Toone, wide receiver—Weber State, Detroit Lions (Mr. Irrelevant 2010 Draft)
 Jamal Miles, running back—Arizona State University, Jacksonville Jaguars, Arizona Rattlers
 Luke Holland, former drummer for the band [[The Word Alive]
 Eduardo Castro,1988
 
           1988

References

External links
 Peoria High School
 Peoria Unified School District

Public high schools in Arizona
Education in Peoria, Arizona
Educational institutions established in 1919
Schools in Maricopa County, Arizona
1919 establishments in Arizona